Peptoniphilus coxii is a bacterium from the genus of Peptoniphilus which has been isolated from human infections.

References

External links
Type strain of Peptoniphilus coxii at BacDive -  the Bacterial Diversity Metadatabase

Bacteria described in 2013
Eubacteriales